Larch Mountain is a mountain in the Northern Oregon Coast Range in Washington County, Oregon, United States. It is the second highest peak in the county with an elevation of 3,452 ft (1,052 m.) It is located near Timber, on Oregon Route 6.

References

External links 
 

Mountains of the Oregon Coast Range
Landforms of Washington County, Oregon